Aethes prangana is a species of moth of the family Tortricidae. It was described by Kennel in  1900. It is found in the southern Urals and Caucasus of Russia, Asia Minor, Armenia and northern Iran.

Adults are on wing in April and June.

References

prangana
Moths described in 1900
Moths of Asia
Moths of Europe
Taxa named by Julius von Kennel